Evgeni Kovyrshin (born 25 January 1986) is a Belarusian professional ice hockey Forward who is currently an unrestricted free agent. He most recently played with Yunost Minsk in the Belarusian Extraleague (BXL).

Kovyrshin participated at the 2010 IIHF World Championship as a member of the Belarus National men's ice hockey team.

References

External links

1986 births
Living people
People from Elektrostal
Belarusian ice hockey centres
HK Brest players
HC Dinamo Minsk players
HC Shakhtyor Soligorsk players
Severstal Cherepovets players
Yunost Minsk players